Mojtaba Yousefi (born: 1983, Ahwaz) is an Iranian Principlist representative of Ahwaz in "Iran's Parliament", who was elected at the 11th Islamic Consultative Assembly from the electoral district of Ahvaz, Bavi, Hamidiyeh and Karun. He is a member of the "Civil Commission and the Integration Commission" in the parliament, and has become the chairman of Branch-4 of the Islamic Consultative Assembly. This Twelver Shia representative possesses a master's degree in management/strategy from the university.

Parliament 
In the first round of the 11th term of the Islamic Consultative Assembly elections, Mojtaba Yousefi was elected as the second representative from Ahvaz, Bavi, Karun and Hamidiyeh constituency with 65,923 votes, and entered the parliament—besides two other Principlists representatives of Ahwaz, namely: Seyyed Karim Hosseini and Shabib Jovijari.

See also 
 List of Iran's parliament representatives (11th term)
 Seyyed Karim Hosseini
 Shabib Jovijari

References 

1983 births
Living people
Members of the Islamic Consultative Assembly by term
Members of the 11th Islamic Consultative Assembly
People from Ahvaz